Mark Weichold is an engineer from Texas A&M University at Qatar, Doha. He was named a Fellow of the Institute of Electrical and Electronics Engineers (IEEE) in 2015 for his contributions to international development of engineering education.

Education
Ph.D., Texas A&M University, December 1983

References 

Fellow Members of the IEEE
Living people
Texas A&M University alumni
Texas A&M University faculty
Year of birth missing (living people)
Place of birth missing (living people)